Selmont-West Selmont is a census-designated place (CDP) in Dallas County, Alabama, United States. At the 2020 census, the population was 2,158.

Geography
Selmont-West Selmont is located in eastern Dallas County at  (32.378494, -87.006659). It is on the south side of the Alabama River, which separates it from the city of the Selma, the county seat, to the north. The Edmund Pettus Bridge carries U.S. Route 80 across the river into Selma at the north end of the CDP.

Demographics

As of the census of 2000, there were 3,502 people, 1,227 households, and 879 families residing in the community. The racial makeup of the community was 91.35% Black or African American, 7.91% White,  0.14% Native American, 0.09% Asian, 0.03% from other races, and 0.49% from two or more races. 0.86% of the population were Hispanic or Latino of any race.

There were 1,227 households, out of which 41.6% had children under the age of 18 living with them, 26.6% were married couples living together, 39.1% had a female householder with no husband present, and 28.3% were non-families. 25.6% of all households were made up of individuals, and 8.2% had someone living alone who was 65 years of age or older. The average household size was 2.85 and the average family size was 3.46.

In the community the population was spread out, with 36.3% under the age of 18, 10.7% from 18 to 24, 27.3% from 25 to 44, 16.7% from 45 to 64, and 9.1% who were 65 years of age or older. The median age was 27 years. For every 100 females, there were 80.4 males. For every 100 females age 18 and over, there were 73.2 males.

The median income for a household in the community was $11,591, and the median income for a family was $15,000. Males had a median income of $27,000 versus $17,786 for females. The per capita income for the community was $9,602. About 53.4% of families and 55.6% of the population were below the poverty line, including 64.8% of those under age 18 and 50.0% of those age 65 or over.

2010 census
As of the census of 2010, there were 2,671 people, 999 households, and 658 families residing in the community. The racial makeup of the community was 93.9% Black or African American, 4.5% White,  0.1% Native American, 0.0% Asian, 0.0% from other races, and 0.4% from two or more races. 1.5% of the population were Hispanic or Latino of any race.

There were 999 households, out of which 27.4% had children under the age of 18 living with them, 22.1% were married couples living together, 36.9% had a female householder with no husband present, and 34.1% were non-families. 29.9% of all households were made up of individuals, and 9.9% had someone living alone who was 65 years of age or older. The average household size was 2.67 and the average family size was 3.36.

In the community the population was spread out, with 27.4% under the age of 18, 10.3% from 18 to 24, 23.4% from 25 to 44, 27.6% from 45 to 64, and 11.3% who were 65 years of age or older. The median age was 35.3 years. For every 100 females, there were 86.7 males. For every 100 females age 18 and over, there were 84.1 males.

The median income for a household in the community was $25,064, and the median income for a family was $26,741. Males had a median income of $21,536 versus $23,101 for females. The per capita income for the community was $9,798. About 36.1% of families and 34.0% of the population were below the poverty line, including 39.3% of those under age 18 and 36.9% of those age 65 or over.

References 

Census-designated places in Dallas County, Alabama
Census-designated places in Alabama